is a Japanese actress, idol, and tarento. She is the winner of the 13th Japan Bishōjo Contest in 2012, and the leader of the Japanese idol group X21.

Career

In 2012, Yoshimoto won the 13th Japan Bishōjo Contest, then entered entertainment industry. In January 2013, with the other twenty contest participants, she formed idol group unit X21. On September 3, 2013, she won the "Best of Beauty 2013" for the teens category. Yoshimoto made her screen debut in the YTV's midnight drama Is There a Vet in the House? in July 2014, and made her film debut in the 2014 film Yumeharuka in a lead role. In June 2015, she received "E-Line Beautiful Award" from the Japan Association of Adult Orthodontics.

Appearances

TV dramas

 Is There a Vet in the House? (YTV, 2014), Hinako Shiba
 Taiga drama Gunshi Kanbei Episode 46-50 (NHK, 2014), Eihime
 I'm Home (TV Asahi, 2015), Yua Takanashi
 High School Chorus (TBS, 2015), Yuria Tani
 From Five To Nine (Fuji TV, 2015), Kaori Ashikaga
 The Girl Who Leapt Through Time (NTV, 2016), Zoy
 Honto ni Atta Kowai Hanashi Natsu no Tokubetsu-hen 2016 - Ryūdō Suru Wazawai (Fuji TV, 2016)
 Daddy Sister (NHK, 2016), Tamaki Mizuta
 Scum's Wish (Fuji TV, 2017), Hanabi Yasuraoka

Film
 Yumeharuka (2014), Haruka Honda
 The Edge of Sin (2015), Saki Kiba
 High&Low The Red Rain (2016)
 Lady in White (2018)
 Mentai Piriri (2019)
 JK Rock (2019)
 Mystic Shrine Maiden (2020)
 Angry Rice Wives (2021)
 Dreaming in Between (2023)

Radio
 X21 Miyu Yoshimoto Gozen 4-ji no Cinderella (6 April 2014 -, Nippon Cultural Broadcasting)
 X21 Miyu Yoshimoto Colorful Box (6 April 2013 -, Radio Nippon)
 X21 Yoshimoto Miyu to Igashira Manami no Bishōjo X2 (7 April 2013 -, Nippon Broadcasting System)

Bibliography

Photobooks
 Miyu Yoshimoto Photobook (Wani Books, May 2013)

Awards

 The 13th Japan Bishōjo Contest (2012): Grand Prix
 The 11th Clarino Beautiful Legs Award (2013): Won(Teens category)
 The Best of Beauty 2013: Won(Teens category)
 E-Line Beautiful Award (2015): Won

References

External links
  
 

1996 births
Japanese idols
Japanese film actresses
Japanese television actresses
Japanese television personalities
Living people
People from Kitakyushu
21st-century Japanese actresses